The Neilson Hays Library is a privately funded English-language library in Bangkok, Thailand. It occupies a historic building on Surawong Road in Bangkok's Bang Rak District, designed in neoclassical style by Italian architects Mario Tamagno and Giovanni Ferrero. The library traces its origins to the Bangkok Ladies' Library Association, which was established in 1869, but did not have a permanent location until the current building was commissioned in 1921 by resident American doctor T. Heyward Hays in memory of his late wife, Jennie Neilson Hays,  who had been an active member of the library board. The building, completed in 1922, features a symmetrical plan, with a domed rotunda originally serving as the entrance hall (now a gallery), and an H-shaped reading room. The building received the ASA Architectural Conservation Award in 1982, and was registered as an ancient monument in 2001. It underwent major restoration work from 2016 to 2018.

References

External links

 

Libraries in Thailand
Registered ancient monuments in Bangkok
Neoclassical architecture in Thailand
Bang Rak district
Library buildings completed in 1922
1922 establishments in Siam